Hurstville is a suburb in Southern Sydney, New South Wales, Australia. It is 16 kilometres south of the Sydney CBD and is part of the St George area. Hurstville is the administrative centre of the local government area of the Georges River Council.

The suburb is predominantly Asian Australian in character, with 63% of the population of Asian origin, among the highest in the country. Sometimes described as "Sydney's Real Chinatown", an estimated 37% of residents are immigrants from mainland China.

History
The name Hurstville is derived from the English 'hurst', meaning 'a wooded eminence', and 'ville', meaning 'town'.

Aboriginal culture
Although it is unknown when they first settled in the Hurstville area, the first inhabitants were Indigenous Australians. At the time of the arrival of the First Fleet, the Indigenous Australians residing in the area were of the Eora tribe, whose numbers spanned along the Georges River, from Botany Bay to present-day Liverpool.

European settlement
The first sustained contact between members of the First Fleet and the Eora tribe, occurred on 20 January 1788 within the boundaries of the present City of Hurstville at Lugarno and Oatley, at Lime Kiln Bay on the Georges River, as recorded by Lieutenant Philip Gidley King in his diary. While Governor Philip explored the south side of the Georges River around Como, King with a party of one other officer and three marines in a six-oared rowboat aimed for the highest point they could see on the north side, probably at Lugarno, and landed at a place they named Lance Point. Although first contact with the Indigenous Australians led to a small altercation where a spear was thrown and a shot fired, later in the day when the party rowed up Lime Kiln Bay towards present day Mortdale they were greeted in a friendly manner by both men and women, and what could only be described as Australia's first picnic took place as food and drink were shared between the two peoples. After a long summer afternoon of mutual contact and conviviality the British sailors rowed back to their ship moored at Botany Bay (see Haworth R.J. 2012, Journal of Australian Colonial History, vol. 14 pp. 1–28, for a reconstruction of King's boat journey and likely route).

The land of the Hurstville region was granted by the government of the new colony of New South Wales to two men: Captain John Townson and his brother Robert Townson in 1808. Captain John Townson was granted 1950 acres (7.9 km²) of land which is now occupied by the suburb of Hurstville and part of Bexley. Robert Townson was granted the land which is now occupied by Penshurst, Mortdale and parts of Peakhurst. In the same year, in the area now known as Riverwood land grants were made to Jane Trotter, Mary Shepley, Charles Doudall, and James Ryan. Later in 1816 another land grant in the same area was given to Mary Redman.

In 1809, Captain John Townson was granted an additional 250 acres (1 km²) in the area now occupied by Kingsgrove and Beverly Hills. The Townson brothers were not happy with the land that they were given because it was not suitable for the farming of sheep for wool and it is likely that the brothers never occupied their land. In 1812, a wealthy merchant named Simeon Lord bought the land of Captain John Townson and named it Lord's Forest. When Lord died, the land became the property of John Rose Holden and James Holt of the Bank of NSW.

Sproule family
Gladwyn is an historic, Italianate house at 96 Queens Road. It was built in 1893 by John Sproule, a local builder and alderman of Hurstville Council, who had acquired the land two years previously. It changed hands many times and was known as Gladwyn by 1906. Hurstville Council eventually acquired the house in 1986. It has been restored and adapted for commercial use, as well as serving as the base for the Hurstville Archival Research and Local Studies Centre. It is heritage-listed at state and local level.

In 1895, Ann Sproule bought land on the opposite side of Queens Road from the Winn brothers of Newcastle, New South Wales. John Sproule then built Yarra-Mundi in 1897, and lived there until 1904. The house then changed hands a number of times over the years. In 1981 it was acquired by the Danebank Church of England School for Girls. The school later sold the house in 2003 and it was subsequently adapted for commercial use. It is heritage-listed.

Development

A dam with a roadway on top was constructed on the Cooks River at Tempe in 1839. In 1843, the road that was to become known as Forest Road was extended from the dam to a hand-winched punt in Lugarno. On the other side of the river, the road continued all the way to Wollongong; however, it was only suitable for travellers on horseback. The new road opened up the Hurstville region and created a settlement at Bottle Forest, now known as Heathcote.

In 1850, the Lord Forest estate was purchased by Michael Gannon (1800–61), who subdivided it into small farms along what is now Croydon Road and three larger farms that were purchased by Dent, Peake, and Ibbotson. The area became known as Gannon's Forest. The land originally granted to Robert Townson was purchased by John Connell in 1830 and, following his death in 1849, the estate was inherited by his grandsons, Elias Pearson Laycock and John Connell Laycock.

The Gannon's Forest post office opened in 1881. The local school was named "Hurstville" by School Inspector MacIntyre when it was established in 1876. When the railway station opened on 15 October 1884, it took the name Hurstville, from the school. Hurstville municipality was incorporated in 1887 and, in 1988, Hurstville was declared a city. The Centenary Bakery on Forest Road is a historic building that has been preserved and once housed a museum. The St George Regional Museum is now located in another historic building in MacMahon Street.

The Hurstville train crash on 3 August 1920 resulted in five people killed and fifty injured. It involved the collision of two steam trains, one arriving from Central Railway Station, which plunged into the back of the other, which was stationary at Hurstville railway station, bound for Sutherland.

Hurstville's residential developments are a mixture of low-density housing, medium-density flats, and high-density apartment buildings.

Economy

Hurstville is the central business district of the St George area. It is a large, multiethnic suburb with a multitude of commercial buildings and high-rise residential buildings dominating the skyline.

The commercial area is centered on the main street, Forest Road, on the northern side of Hurstville railway station. Forest Road is the main shopping street which features branches of many retail shops as well as numerous banks (Commonwealth, ANZ, National Australia Bank, Westpac, St George, HSBC, Bank of China) and other financial institutions. The commercial developments also extend to surrounding streets concentrated from Queens Road to The Avenue and on the southern side of Hurstville Railway station, around Ormonde Parade. The commercial developments extend further along Forest Road, west towards Penshurst and east towards Bexley.

Retail and shopping 

Hurstville has two major shopping centres, Westfield Hurstville and Hurstville Central. There are also a few smaller shopping centres such as Hurstville Times Plaza, East Quarter, Metro Centre, Hurstville City Centre and Union Arcade.

Restaurants and cafes 
Hurstville has a wide variety of restaurants and cafes and is known as a major dining destination in the St George area of Sydney. There are a large number of Chinese (including Cantonese), Japanese and Korean restaurants and eateries.

Other 
The administrative offices of the Georges River Council are located in the Hurstville Civic Centre in MacMahon Street. This street also features a number of historic buildings such as the Friendly Pharmacy, old Fire Station, Ritz Hotel and Hurstville Museum & Gallery (formerly known as the St George Regional Museum), which houses the cake decorating collection formerly held at the Australian Cakes and Sugar Art Museum. Hurstville City Library is located nearby on Queens Road.

Culture
The St Clair Recording Studio operated for about a year from December 1965 to December 1966 and recorded the Bee Gees among other musicians. AC/DC played at the Hurstville Civic Centre (Marana Hall/Rivoli Hall) on eight occasions between 1974-1977.

A karaoke place opened in 2011 near the Meridian Hotel, the first ever one in Hurstville.

The Hurstville Museum & Gallery focuses on local history, art, and culture. According to the Museum's website, it "is home to high quality exhibitions, a diverse range of public programs and a collection of approximately 5,000 objects and artworks from the local area."

Transport
Hurstville railway station is a major station on the T4 Eastern Suburbs & Illawarra Line of the Sydney Trains network and the South Coast Line on the NSW TrainLink network. All Suburban and Intercity trains stop at Hurstville. Hurstville is 20 minutes from Sydney Central railway station on the express service. Hurstville is a major bus interchange with bus services departing from Forest Road and Ormonde Parade.
Hurstville is also serviced by St George Community Transport, a HACC funded transport service for the Frail Aged, people with disability and their carers.

Churches
St George's Hurstville Anglican Church, St Michael's Roman Catholic Church, Hurstville Presbyterian Church, Hurstville Church of Christ, Hurstville Uniting Church, Hurstville Seventh-day Adventist Church, Hurstville Assemblies of God, Salvation Army, Church of the Living God.

Schools
 Hurstville Adventist School, Hurstville Boys High School, Hurstville Public School, Hurstville South Public School, Danebank Anglican Girls School, Hurstville Grove Infants School, Beverly Hills Public School and St George Christian School.
 Sydney Technical High School, Bethany College and St. Mary's Star of the Sea Catholic Primary School are located just over the border in Bexley.

Landmarks
 Hurstville Civic Centre, Hurstville Entertainment Centre, Hurstville City Library, St George Regional Museum, Park Plaza Apartments

Parks
 Kempt Field, Woodville Park, Hurstville Park, Thorpe Park, Doyle Gardens.

Population

Demographics

The first European settlers in the area were mostly of British and Irish ancestry. From the late 1960s, Hurstville, like many surrounding areas, became home to migrants from all around the world. The first wave of migrants included Greeks and Italians who began moving south from Sydney's inner-city suburbs. They were followed by more European migrants, including many from the former Yugoslavia.

From the 1990s, the Chinese community within Hurstville has grown considerably. Much of this was related to significant migration from Hong Kong during the 1990s and migration from Mainland China during the 2000s. Many local businesses are operated by people of Chinese background, the interests of which are advanced by the St. George Asian Business Association. Hurstville is a hub for Asian groceries, food and services.

According to the 2016 Australian Bureau of Statistics Census of Population, there were 29,822 residents in Hurstville. 27.8% of people were born in Australia. The most common countries of birth were China 36.9%, Nepal 7.1%, Hong Kong 4.0%, Indonesia 1.8% and India 1.5%. 18.1% of people only spoke English at home. Other languages spoken at home included Mandarin 32.3%, Cantonese 17.9%, Nepali 7.2%, Arabic 2.8% and Greek 2.5%. The most common responses for religion were No Religion 42.7%, Catholic 11.8%, Hinduism 8.2% and Buddhism 8.1%. The most common ancestries in Hurstville were Chinese 49.4%, English 6.6%, Nepalese 6.6%, Australian 5.1% and Greek 2.9% and 1.3% Filipinos.

Notable residents

 Arthur Samuel Allen (1894-1959) - Army officer and accountant, audit clerk in NSW Government Railways

Ronald Ernest Aitchison - Physicist
Ezekiel Baker - Politician
Roy Bossi (1894-1964) - Rugby league player
Jack Brabham (1926-2014) - Three-time Formula One World Champion motor racer
Ambrose George Enticknap (1894-1976) - Orchardist and politician 
Jayden Brailey - Australian rugby league player playing for the Cronulla-Sutherland Sharks
 Matthew Dufty - Australian rugby league player playing for the Canterbury Bulldogs
Stella Maria Sarah Miles Franklin - Writer
Neville Hayes - Swimmer
Arthur Justice (1902-1977) - Rugby league player, coach, and administrator
Thomas John Ley (1880-1947) - Politician and murderer 
Jack Lindwall - Rugby league player for St George
Ray Lindwall - Australian Test cricketer, also played rugby league for St George; younger brother of Jack
Craig Nicholls - Musician
Eris Michael O'Brien (1895-1974) - Catholic archbishop and Australian historian 
Kerry O'Keeffe - Australian test cricketer and sportscaster
Gordon Stanley Reid (1923-1989) - Parliamentary official, political scientist and governor 
 Ken Rosewall - Tennis player
 Michael Rush - champion Australian sculler, spent his last years farming a Hurstville small-holding.

Sister cities
 – Shiroishi, Miyagi, Japan, since 23 October 1994
 – Changzhou, Jiangsu, China, since 8 May 1998

References

External links
 Georges River Council website
 Businesses in Hurstville
 Georges River Council - History of Hurstville
St George & Sutherland Shire Leader

 
Suburbs of Sydney
1887 establishments in Australia